The 1941–42 1re série season was the 25th season of the 1re série, the top level of ice hockey in France. Chamonix Hockey Club won their ninth championship.

Final
Chamonix Hockey Club - Français Volants 7:1

External links
Season on hockeyarchives.info

Fra
1941–42 in French ice hockey
Ligue Magnus seasons